Villa del Sole is an eclectic villa situated in Sanremo, Italy.

History 
The villa, designed by architect , was built in 1898.

The property belonged for many years to Pietro d'Acquarone, 1st Duke d'Acquarone, who served as Minister of the Royal Household between 1939 and 1944. The villa also occasionally hosted Elena of Montenegro, Queen consort of Italy during her stays in Sanremo.

Description 
The villa, which features an eclectic style, has a mansard roof.

Gallery

References

External links

Villas in Sanremo